Lauren St John (born December 1966) is an author born in Rhodesia, now Zimbabwe. She is best known for her children's novels including The White  Giraffe and Dead Man's Cove which won her a Blue Peter Book Award in 2011.

Life and career
Lauren St John was born in December 1966 in Gatooma, Rhodesia (now Kadoma, Zimbabwe). When she was eleven, St John and her family moved to a nature reserve called Rainbow End's farm in Gadzema. It was later the focus of her memoir, Rainbow's End and many of her children's books are influenced by the nature reserve in which she grew up.

After studying journalism in Harare St John moved to London where she was the golf correspondent for The Sunday Times for almost a decade.

In 2011, St John won the Blue Peter Book of the Year Award for her book Dead Man's Cove, about an eleven year old girl called Laura Marlin who becomes a detective. It is the first in a series of books. Dead Man's Cove was also shortlisted for a Galaxy National Book Award for Children's Book of the Year. The book was optioned by Centurion Television in 2016.

As well as writing, St John has also done work with the wildlife charity, Born Free Foundation. She became involved after contacting the Foundation while she was running a school conservation project called Animals Are Not Rubbish in 2009.

Children's fiction
Early Readers series
Shumba's Big Adventure (2013) 
Anthony Ant Saves the Day (2015) 
A Friend for Christmas (2016) 
Mercy and the Hippo (2017) 

Animal Healer series
The White Giraffe (2006) 
Dolphin Song (2007) 
The Last Leopard (2008) 
The Elephant's Tale (2009) 
Operation Rhino (2015) 

Laura Marlin mysteries
Dead Man's Cove (2010) 
Kidnap in the Caribbean (2011) 
Kentucky Thriller (2012) 
Rendezvous in Russia (2013) 
The Midnight Picnic (2014) 
The Secret of Supernatural Creek (2017) 

Wolfe and Lamb Mysteries

 Kat Wolfe Investigates (2018) 
Kat Wolfe Takes the Case (2019) 
Kat Wolfe on Thin Ice (2021) 

Stand-alone novels

The Snow Angel (2017) 
Wave Riders (2022) ISBN 9780374309671

Young adult fiction
The One Dollar Horse series
The One Dollar Horse (2012) 
Race the Wind (2013) 
Firestorm (2014) 

Stand-alone books
The Glory (2015)

Adult fiction and non-fiction
Fiction
The Obituary Writer (2013) 

Non-fiction
Rainbow's End: A Memoir of Childhood, War and an African Farm (2007) 
Hardcore Troubador: The Life and Near Death of Steve Earle (2002)

References

1966 births
Living people
Rhodesian people
Zimbabwean children's writers
Zimbabwean emigrants to the United Kingdom
Zimbabwean women children's writers
Zimbabwean novelists
Women novelists
21st-century novelists
People from Kadoma, Zimbabwe
20th-century Zimbabwean writers
20th-century Zimbabwean women writers
21st-century Zimbabwean writers
21st-century Zimbabwean women writers